Hainan Township is a township under the administration of Xichang, in southern Sichuan, China. , it has four villages under its administration.

References 

Township-level divisions of Sichuan
Xichang